Yasha Khalili (born April 27, 1988)  is an Iranian footballer who plays for Aluminium Hormozgan.

Club career
Khalili joined Aluminium in 2010 after spending the previous season at Mes Sarcheshme in the Azadegan League

 Assist Goals

References

1988 births
Living people
Sanat Mes Kerman F.C. players
Mes Sarcheshme players
Aluminium Hormozgan F.C. players
Iranian footballers
Association football midfielders